Exodus (stylized in all caps) is the second studio album by South Korean–Chinese boy band Exo. It was released on March 30, 2015, by SM Entertainment and distributed by KT Music. The album was re-released as Love Me Right on June 3. With both versions of the album, Exo had the largest sales volume in the shortest amount of time for any K-pop artist at the time, selling more than one million copies in two months. 

This is the first album to not feature Kris and Luhan, as they both filed lawsuits against SM Entertainment and left the group back in of May and October 2014 respectively. It was the last album to have the group divided into Exo-K and Exo-M units. This is also the last album to feature Tao, as he suspended his activity a month later, and on August of that same year, filed a lawsuit against SM Entertainment, thereby departing the group.

Background and release
Before the album's release, SM Entertainment held a press conference, in which all the members were present except Lay, who was in China focusing on his then-upcoming film. Suho also stated that he had never thought about the sales numbers after the release of the album, and just wanted to bring new music to fans of the band. He said that the only thing on the members' mind whilst making the album was for the listeners to enjoy it. He also concluded by saying that it would be a new start for Exo, after the lawsuits of former band members Luhan and Kris, and that the members would show a brighter, fresher side to their fans.

The album features the lyrics from the likes of Teddy Riley and also Shinee's Jonghyun who wrote the lyrics of the song "Playboy". There are 10 songs that span a number of genres including dance, R&B, and ballad. Exo stated that 20 different covers of the album would be released, both online and in physical copies. Each member would be featured on their own cover on the album, in both a Korean and Chinese version. The Korean versions were colored gold while the Chinese versions were silver. When aligned, the spines of all the albums together would create their new logo.

Promotion 
Exo held their comeback stage for "Call Me Baby" on M! Countdown (Mnet) where they co-operated their energetic choreography in various different stage locations. Along with the lead single, the band performed "My Answer" both on M! Countdown and Music Bank (KBS), and the title track both on Show! Music Core (MBC) and Inkigayo (SBS). Exo won their first award on Inkigayo aired on April 5, 2015. Promotions for the album were wrapped up by the band's performances on The Show (SBS MTV) aired on April 28, 2015. Exo received a total of 18 music show trophies for "Call Me Baby", breaking their own record previously held for "Growl" (14 trophies).

Commercial performance 
According to SM Entertainment, pre-orders for Exodus reached 502,440 copies (321,200 in Korean and 181,240 in Chinese), already passing the half million mark. Domestically, the Korean version of the album topped the Gaon Weekly Albums Chart for four consecutive weeks, while its Chinese counterpart reached the runner-up position. Both versions occupied the first two spots until their third week of release. Later, the Korean version of its repackaged edition Love Me Right stayed atop the chart for two straight weeks. Exodus became the best-selling album in the first quarter of 2015, only two days after its release on March 30.

In Japan, both albums entered the top 10 of the Oricon Weekly Albums Chart, peaking at numbers four (Korean) and seven (Chinese), respectively. The combined version of the album sold over 6,000 copies in the United States and charted at number 95 on the Billboard 200 in its initial week of release. In doing so, Exodus became the second best-selling K-pop album in the region and the highest-charting album by a K-pop boy band. The album also topped Billboards World Albums Chart on the issue date of April 18, 2015, and stayed in the top 10 for six consecutive weeks. With the pre-order sales figures for Love Me Right combined, the album's total sales surpassed one million units globally.

Singles
SM Entertainment released the song "First Love" on YouTube to give the fans a sneak peek. According to the members, it was a present for the fans after waiting patiently and bearing with the problems and struggles faced by the band, while still supporting them with their activities. The song was uploaded onto music sharing websites, but was then made private after 10 hours of uploading it.

The lead single for the album, "Call Me Baby", was released online on March 28, 2015, while the accompanying music videos of two versions (both in Korean and Chinese, respectively) came out three days later through a number of media. The Korean version of the single peaked at number two on the Gaon Singles Chart, while its Chinese counterpart reached number 36. It also entered the Canadian Hot 100 for the week of April 25, 2015, debuting and peaking at number 98. Since its release, "Call Me Baby" has sold almost 826,000 digital copies in South Korea, and 831,000 worldwide.

The Korean version of "Love Me Right", the lead single for the album's repackaged edition later topped the Gaon Singles Chart, becoming the band's second number-one hit in their native country following "December, 2014 (The Winter's Tale)" (see Exo discography). It has sold about 625,000 digital copies in South Korea. The songs "El Dorado" and "Beautiful" from the album, were previously used three years prior, when SM Entertainment released the teasers for the band members. The songs used then were only short drafts and clips from the songs and had no lyrics. "El Dorado" was used in Chanyeol's teaser, whilst the teaser for "Beautiful" starred the members Lay, Baekhyun and Chen.

Accolades

Track listing
Credits adapted from Naver.

Notes
 "Call Me Baby", "Love Me Right", "Tender Love", and "Promise (EXO 2014)" are sung by all members, with the rest being sung by EXO-K and EXO-M members in their respective Korean and Chinese versions except where individual members are indicated.
 Tao does not participate in "Love Me Right", "Tender Love", and "Promise (EXO 2014)" due to his termination. His voice is heard in "First Love", even though he does not appear in the artwork of the repackage album.
 EXO Member's Lay composed the music and wrote the lyrics, together with Chen and Chanyeol for Promise.

Charts

Korean and Chinese versions

Combined version

Release history

See also
 List of best-selling albums in South Korea
 List of K-pop on the Billboard charts
 List of number-one albums of 2015 (South Korea)

Footnotes

References

External links
 
 
 
 

2015 albums
Albums produced by the Underdogs (production team)
Exo albums
Korean-language albums
Mandarin-language albums
SM Entertainment albums
Genie Music albums
Grand Prize Golden Disc Award-winning albums